The Haval Shenshou (哈弗神兽) is a compact crossover produced by Great Wall Motor under the Haval brand.

Overview

The Shenshou was presented as the production version of the Haval XY Concept unveiled in Auto Shanghai in April 2021. The final production version of the Shenshou was unveiled in China in August 2021, and launched on December 18, 2021.

The Shenshou rides on the LEMON modular platform of Great Wall Motors, and will be equipped with GWM's Coffee Intelligence system for infotainment, using the Qualcomm 8155 chip.

The term Shenshou is the Chinese word for "Mythical Beast" in English.

Powertrain

References

External links

Shenshou
Cars introduced in 2021
Compact sport utility vehicles
Crossover sport utility vehicles
All-wheel-drive vehicles
Cars of China